The 2010 Billie Jean King Cup was the 2nd edition of this tennis exhibition tournament. Seven-time Grand Slam champion Venus Williams, 2009 French Open Champion Svetlana Kuznetsova, and 2009 US Open Champion Kim Clijsters participated. 2009 Australian Open and Wimbledon Champion Serena Williams had to withdraw from the event due to a leg injury. She was replaced by 2008 French Open Champion Ana Ivanovic. In the first semifinal, Clijsters defeated Ivanovic in a tiebreaker (7–2), despite Ivanovic having match point at 5–4 up. Williams defeated Kuznetsova in the second semifinal, 6–4.  Williams defeated Clijsters in the championship match by a score of 6–4 3–6 7–5.

Players

Draw

References 

 

Billie Jean King Cup
BNP Paribas Showdown